The District of Columbia Judicial Nominating Commission is the judicial nominating commission of Washington D.C. It selects potential judges for the Superior Court of the District of Columbia and the District of Columbia Court of Appeals.

Duties 
When there occurs a vacancy on the Superior Court of the District of Columbia or the District of Columbia Court of Appeals, the commission, which consists of a seven-member panel, is responsible for creating a list of three candidates to fill vacant positions on the District's judiciary. The commission then sends the list to the President of the United States who selects one nominee to fill the position. The nomination is then sent to the United States Senate for confirmation.  Judges serves a fifteen-year term.

The commission is also responsible on selecting the chief judges on the courts to their four-year term.

See also 
 List of Superior Court of the District of Columbia judges

References

External links 
 Judicial Nomination Commission
 District of Columbia Judicial Nomination Commission Ballotpedia

Selection of judges in the United States
Judges of the Superior Court of the District of Columbia